Xplore may refer to:
 IEEE Xplore, an online database of IEEE research publications
 A series of PDAs by Group Sense PDA, such as the Xplore G18 smartphone
 XploRe, a statistical software environment
 Xplore (space exploration company), a satellite manufacturer and operator
 Xplore Technologies, designer, marketer and manufacturer of rugged tablet computers
 Xplore Dundee, a bus operator based in Dundee, Scotland
 Xplore!, science centre in Wrexham, Wales

See also
 Explorer (disambiguation)
 Exploration